Badr Eddin El Ouazni (born 13 November 1991) is an Italian professional footballer who as a forward for Serie D club Chieti F.C. He is nicknamed Bruno, in Italy.

Club career
El Ouazni has spent most of his career playing for professional and semi-professional teams in Serie D and Eccellenza. He began his career with Forza e Coraggio, followed by stints at Real Vortuno, San Severo, Rieti, Gelbison, Marcianise, and then Herculaneum where he spent three years and won the Eccellenza. He transferred to the Serie C club Juve Stabia in 2018. El Ouazni made his professional debut with Juve Stabia in a 4–0 Serie C win over Siracusa on 16 September 2018. He helped Juve Stabia win the Serie C title in his debut season. He thereafter transferred to Cavese, Foggia, and Casarano before a 2-week transfer to Afragolese that was terminated early after a change in directors. Shortly after he moved to Lavello on 5 February 2021. In July 2021, El Ouazni signed for hometown club F.C. Matese. El Ouazni was appointed captain of Matese ahead of the 2021–22 season, replacing Pellegrino Albanese, who joined Pineto in July. In doing so, he became the club's second-ever captain, following its founding in June 2020. El Ouazni registered 6 league goals for Matese, before moving to fellow Serie D side Chieti F.C. in December of that year.

Personal life
Born in Italy, El Ouazni is of Moroccan descent.

Honours
Herculaneum
Eccellenza: 2015–16

Juve Stabia
Serie C: 2018–19

References

External links
 
 
 

1991 births
Living people
Sportspeople from Piedimonte Matese
Italian footballers
Italian people of Moroccan descent
Italian sportspeople of African descent
Sportspeople of Moroccan descent
Taranto F.C. 1927 players
F.C. Rieti players
S.S. Juve Stabia players
Cavese 1919 players
Calcio Foggia 1920 players
A.S.D. Football Club Matese players
Serie C players
Serie D players
Eccellenza players
Association football forwards
Footballers from Campania